The following are the association football events of the year 2000 throughout the world.

Events

January 1 – Ronald Koeman starts as manager at Dutch club Vitesse.
UEFA Euro 2000: France won 2–1 in extra time over Italy, with a golden goal by David Trezeguet. This was France's second European Championship title.
2006 FIFA World Cup: Germany wins the right to host for second time the event.
UEFA Champions League: Spanish giants Real Madrid and Valencia faced off in the first ever all-country European cup final with Madrid winning 3–0. This was Real Madrid's eighth European Cup title.
Copa Libertadores 2000: Won by Boca Juniors after defeating Palmeiras 4–3 on a penalty shootout after a final aggregate score of 2–2.
2000 FIFA Club World Championship: Corinthians beat Vasco da Gama 4–3 on penalties after a 0–0 draw.
UEFA Cup: Galatasaray wins 4–1 on penalties in the final against Arsenal after a 0–0 draw at the end of the match. This was the first European title won by a Turkish team.
UEFA Super Cup: Galatasaray beats Real Madrid 2–1 after extra time with a golden goal by Mário Jardel.
March 21 – Ajax appoints Hans Westerhof as caretaker-manager after the resignation of Jan Wouters.
March 31 – Gerard van der Lem resigns as manager of AZ
May 20 – Chelsea wins the FA Cup by a 1–0 win over Aston Villa.
July 24 – Real Madrid signs Barcelona's Portuguese star Luís Figo for a then world record transfer fee of €60 million.
August 13 – PSV wins the Johan Cruyff Shield, the annual opening of the new season in the Eredivisie, by a 2–0 win over Roda JC at the Amsterdam Arena.
August 15 – The Parkstad Limburg Stadion is officially opened with a friendly between home club Roda JC and Spanish side Real Zaragoza (2–2).
September 2 – Louis van Gaal makes his debut as the manager of Netherlands national team with a draw (2–2) in the World Cup qualifier against the Republic of Ireland. Two PSV players make their debut as well: striker Arnold Bruggink and defender Wilfred Bouma.
November 28 – Boca Juniors wins the Intercontinental Cup in Tokyo for the second time, defeating Spain's Real Madrid 2–1; Martín Palermo scores both goals for the Argentinian club.

Winner national club championship

Asia
  – Anyang LG 
  – Kashima Antlers
  – Al-Sadd
  – Anyang LG Cheetahs
  – BEC Tero Sasana

Europe
  – Dinamo Zagreb
  – Herfølge BK
  – Manchester United
  – Monaco
  – Bayern Munich
  – Olympiacos
  – KR
  – Shelbourne
  – Lazio
  – PSV
  – Linfield
  – Polonia Warsaw
  – Sporting CP
  – Celtic
  – Deportivo La Coruña
  – Galatasaray
  – The New Saints
  – Red Star Belgrade

North America
 – Toronto Croatia (CPSL)

Verano – Toluca
Invierno – Morelia
 – Kansas City Wizards (MLS)

South America

Clausura – River Plate
Apertura – Boca Juniors
 – Jorge Wilstermann
 – Vasco da Gama (Copa João Havelange)
 – Universidad de Chile
 – Olmedo
 – Olimpia Asunción
 – Universitario de Deportes

International tournaments
 African Cup of Nations in Ghana and Nigeria (January 22 – February 13, 2000)
 
 
 
 2000 CONCACAF Gold Cup in United States (February 12 – February 27, 2000)
 
 
 —
 UEFA European Football Championship in Belgium and the Netherlands (June 10 – July 2, 2000)
 
 
 —
Olympic Games in Sydney, Australia (September 13 – 30 2000)
Men's Tournament
 
 
 
Women's Tournament
  Norway
  United States
  Germany
 2000 AFC Asian Cup in Lebanon (October 12 – October 29, 2000)

National team results

Europe



South America



Movies
Air Bud: World Pup (US)
Purely Belter (UK)
There's Only One Jimmy Grimble (UK)

Births

 January 14 – Jonathan David, Canadian footballer
 January 26 – Abel Ruiz, Spanish footballer
 February 15 – Jakub Kiwior, Polish footballer
 February 20 – Josh Sargent, American soccer player 
 February 22 – Timothy Weah, American soccer player 
 February 24 – Antony, Brazilian footballer
 February 28 – Moise Kean, Italian footballer
 February 29 – Ferran Torres, Spanish international
 March 21 – Matty Longstaff, English footballer 
 March 25
Ozan Kabak, Turkish footballer
Jadon Sancho, English footballer
 April 2 – Josip Stanišić, Croatian footballer
 April 6 – Maxence Lacroix, French youth international
 April 19 – Azzedine Ounahi, Moroccan footballer
 April 25 – Dejan Kulusevski, Swedish footballer
 May 18 – Ryan Sessegnon, English youth international
 May 24 – Noah Okafor, Swiss footballer
 May 28 – Phil Foden, English footballer
 May 30 – Fábio Vieira, Portuguese footballer
 June 9 – Diego Lainez, Mexican footballer
 June 28 – Yukinari Sugawara, Japanese footballer
 July 6 – Michael Obafemi, Irish footballer 
 July 12 – Vinícius Júnior, Brazilian footballer
 July 28 
Keito Nakamura, Japanese youth international 
 Lee O'Connor, Irish youth international
 Emile Smith Rowe, English youth international
 August 29 – Julia Grosso, Canadian international
 August 31 – Angel Gomes, English footballer
 September 27 – Liberato Cacace, New Zealand international
 September 29 – Giorgi Mamardashvili, Georgian international
 October 20 – Dominik Szoboszlai, Hungarian footballer
 November 2 – Alphonso Davies, Canadian international
 November 3 – Sergiño Dest, American soccer player
 November 7 – Callum Hudson-Odoi, English international

Deaths

January
 January 27 – Lucas Sebastião da Fonseca (72), Mozambican-born Portuguese footballer
 January 29 – Heinz Flotho, German international footballer (born 1915)
 January 29 – Harry Thompson, English footballer (born 1915)

February
 February 23 – Sir Stanley Matthews (85), English footballer
 February 23 – Dennis Evans (69), English footballer

March
 March 24 - George Kirby (66), English footballer

April
 April 4 – Brandãozinho, Brazilian defender, Brazilian squad member at the 1954 FIFA World Cup. (74)
 April 8 – Moacir Barbosa Nascimento, Brazilian goalkeeper, runner-up at the 1950 FIFA World Cup. (79)
 April 14 – Wilf Mannion (81), English footballer
 April 24 - Chic Brodie (63), Scottish footballer

May
 May 1 – Cláudio Christovam de Pinho, Brazilian striker, the biggest scorer of all time for Sport Club Corinthians Paulista. (77)
 May 18 – Domingos da Guia, Brazilian defender, semi-finalist at the 1938 FIFA World Cup. (87)
 May 31 – Rodolfo Pini, Uruguayan midfielder, winner of the 1950 FIFA World Cup. (74)

July
 July 15 – Kalle Svensson (74), Swedish footballer 
 July 24 – Peter Dubovský (28), Slovak footballer
 July 29 – Benny Fenton (81), English footballer

August
 August 15 – Eduardo Luján Manera (55), Argentine footballer and manager
 August 18 – Maurice Evans (63), English footballer
 August 24 – Bob McPhail (94), Scottish footballer

October
 October 2 – Elek Schwartz (91), Romanian footballer
 October 5 – Cătălin Hâldan (24), Romanian footballer

November
 November 1 – George Armstrong (56), English footballer and coach
 November 2 – Simeon Simeonov (54), Bulgarian football goalkeeper
 November 15 – Pietro Pasinati, Italian striker, winner of the 1938 FIFA World Cup. (90)
 November 25 – Canito (44), Spanish footballer
 November 27 - Willie Cunnigham (75), Scottish footballer

December
 December 21 – Décio Esteves, Brazilian midfielder, runner up at the 1959 South American Championship (Argentina). (73)

References

 
Association football by year